Salmon Creek is a stream in Thurston County in the U.S. state of Washington. It is a tributary to the Skookumchuck River.

Salmon Creek was so named on account of its stock of salmon.

References

Rivers of Thurston County, Washington
Rivers of Washington (state)